Diodorus Siculus, or Diodorus of Sicily ( 1st century BC), was an ancient Greek historian. He is known for writing the monumental universal history Bibliotheca historica, in forty books, fifteen of which survive intact, between 60 and 30 BC. 
The history is arranged in three parts. The first covers mythic history up to the destruction of Troy, arranged geographically, describing regions around the world from Egypt, India and Arabia to Europe. The second covers the time from the Trojan War to the death of Alexander the Great. The third covers the period to about 60 BC. Bibliotheca, meaning 'library', acknowledges that he was drawing on the work of many other authors.

Life
According to his own work, he was born in Agyrium in Sicily (now called Agira). With one exception, antiquity affords no further information about his life and doings beyond his written works. Only Jerome, in his Chronicon under the "year of Abraham 1968" (49 BC), writes, "Diodorus of Sicily, a writer of Greek history, became illustrious". However, his English translator, Charles Henry Oldfather, remarks on the "striking coincidence" that one of only two known Greek inscriptions from Agyrium (Inscriptiones Graecae XIV, 588) is the tombstone of one "Diodorus, the son of Apollonius".

Work

Diodorus' universal history, which he named Bibliotheca historica ("Historical Library"), was immense and consisted of 40 books, of which 1–5 and 11–20 survive: fragments of the lost books are preserved in Photius and the Excerpts of Constantine Porphyrogenitus.

It was divided into three sections. The first six books treated the mythic history of the non-Hellenic and Hellenic tribes to the destruction of Troy and are geographical in theme, and describe the history and culture of Ancient Egypt (book I), of Mesopotamia, India, Scythia, and Arabia (II), of North Africa (III), and of Greece and Europe (IV–VI).

In the next section (books VII–XVII), he recounts the history of the world from the Trojan War down to the death of Alexander the Great. The last section (books XVII to the end) concerns the historical events from the successors of Alexander down to either 60 BC or the beginning of Julius Caesar's Gallic Wars. (The end has been lost, so it is unclear whether Diodorus reached the beginning of the Gallic War as he promised at the beginning of his work or, as evidence suggests, old and tired from his labours he stopped short at 60 BC.) He selected the name "Bibliotheca" in acknowledgment that he was assembling a composite work from many sources. Identified authors on whose works he drew include Hecataeus of Abdera, Ctesias of Cnidus, Ephorus, Theopompus, Hieronymus of Cardia, Duris of Samos, Diyllus, Philistus, Timaeus, Polybius, and Posidonius.

See also
 Acadine
 Callon of Epidaurus
 Diophantus of Abae
 Pliny the Elder
 Strabo

Citations

General and cited references

Further reading

 Braithwaite-Westoby, Kara. "Diodorus and the Alleged Revolts of 374–373 BCE," Classical Philology 115, no. 2 (April 2020): 265–270.
 Clarke, Katherine. 1999. "Universal perspectives in Historiography." In The Limits of Historiography: Genre and Narrative in Ancient Historical Texts. Edited by Christina Shuttleworth Kraus, 249–279. Mnemosyne. Supplementum 191. Leiden, The Netherlands: Brill.
 Hammond, Nicholas G. L. 1998. "Portents, Prophecies, and Dreams in Diodorus' Books 14–17." Greek, Roman and Byzantine Studies 39.4: 407–428.
 Hau, Lisa Irene, Alexander Meeus, and Brian Sheridan (eds.). 2018. Diodoros of Sicily: Historiographical Theory and Practice in the Bibliotheke. Peeters: Leuven.
 McQueen, Earl I. 1995. Diodorus Siculus. The Reign of Philip II: The Greek and Macedonian Narrative from Book XVI. A Companion. London: Bristol Classical Press.
 Muntz, Charles E. 2017. Diodorus Siculus and the World of the Late Roman Republic. New York: Oxford Univ. Press.
 Pfuntner, Laura. 2015. "Reading Diodorus through Photius: The Case of the Sicilian Slave Revolts." Greek, Roman and Byzantine Studies 55.1: 256–272.
 Rubincam, Catherine. 1987. "The Organization and Composition of Diodorus' Bibliotheke." Échos du monde classique (= Classical views) 31:313–328.
 Sacks, Kenneth S. 1990. Diodorus Siculus and the First Century. Princeton, NJ: Princeton Univ. Press.
 Sinclair, Robert K. 1963. "Diodorus Siculus and the Writing of History." Proceedings of the African Classical Association 6:36–45.
 Stronk, Jan P. 2017. Semiramis' Legacy. The History of Persia According to Diodorus of Sicily. Edinburgh: Edinburgh Univ. Press.
 Sulimani, Iris. 2008. "Diodorus' Source-Citations: A Turn in the Attitude of Ancient Authors Towards their Predecessors?" Athenaeum 96.2: 535–567.

External links

 Greek original works
 
 
 
 

 English translations
 
 
 
 
 

1st-century BC Greek people
1st-century BC historians
30s BC deaths
90s BC births
Classical geography
Hellenistic-era historians
Historians from Magna Graecia
Greek-language historians from the Roman Empire
Sicilian Greeks
Works about mining